"Everyday of My Life" is a song by Australian band Little River Band, released in April 1976 as the first and only single from the group's second studio album, After Hours. The song peaked at number 29 on the Australian Kent Music Report singles chart.

Track listings
7" (EMI 11116)
Side A. "Everyday of My Life" - 3:40
Side B. "Days On the Road" - 3:45

Charts

References 

1976 singles
Little River Band songs
1976 songs
EMI Records singles